Wahlisaurus is an extinct genus of leptonectid ichthyosaur. The holotype was found in the Scunthorpe Mudstone in Nottinghamshire in 1951 and described in 2016 by Dean Lomax. The type species is Wahlisaurus massare, and two specimens have been found: the first consisting of a skull and an incomplete skeleton, and the second a single coracoid.

Discovery 
The first specimen was in the New Walk Museum in Leicester for more than 60 years before it was identified by Dean Lomax as a new species and described in 2016.

The second specimen was found in 1996 and identified as Wahlisaurus in 2018 in the private collection of Simon Carpenter, who donated the specimen to the Bristol Museum and Art Gallery.

Description
Wahlisaurus shares features, such as a slender and long snout, with other leptonectids of that time (e.g. Eurhinosaurus, Excalibosaurus, etc.). The extent of the overbite is less than that of Eurhinosaurus. Differences can be found in Wahlisaurus` shoulder girdle. Both the coracoid and the contact between the coracoid and the scapula possess a foramen.

Etymology
LEICT G454.1951.5 was named in honour of William Wahl and Professor Judy Massare, both specialists in mesozoic marine reptiles who mentored Lomax.

References

 01
Ichthyosauromorph genera
Early Jurassic ichthyosaurs
Ichthyosaurs of Europe
Fossil taxa described in 2016